Langside (Ward 7) is one of the 23 wards of Glasgow City Council. On its creation in 2007 and in 2012 it returned three council members, using the single transferable vote system. For the 2017 Glasgow City Council election, the boundaries were changed, the ward increased in size and returned four members.

Boundaries
The ward is situated on the south side of Glasgow. As well as Langside itself, it also includes Battlefield, Mount Florida (including Hampden Park and the New Victoria Hospital), the northern parts of King's Park and Cathcart and the eastern part of Shawlands. The 2017 expansion took in Toryglen from the Southside Central ward and a few streets on the north side of the Cathcart Circle Line railway which had previously been in Newlands/Auldburn when the boundary was the White Cart Water.

The ethnic makeup of the expanded Langside ward using the 2011 census population statistics was:

89.4% White Scottish / British / Irish / Other
6.5% Asian (Mainly Pakistani)
1.3% Black (Mainly African)
0.9% Mixed / Other Ethnic Group

Councillors

Election results

2022 election
2022 Glasgow City Council election

2017 election
2017 Glasgow City Council election

2012 election
2012 Glasgow City Council election

2015 by-election
On 14 May 2015, Green counsellor Liam Hainey resigned his seat for family and health reasons. A by-election was held on 6 August 2015 and was won by the SNP's Anna Richardson.

2007 election
2007 Glasgow City Council election

See also
Wards of Glasgow

References

External links
Listed Buildings in Langside Ward, Glasgow City at British Listed Buildings

Wards of Glasgow